Bufo pageoti, also known as Tonkin toad or Burma(n) toad (when referring to no-longer-recognized Bufo burmanus) is a species of toad in the family Bufonidae. It is found in southern China (Yunnan), north-east and western Myanmar, and northern Vietnam.

It breeds in streams. It is a rare species threatened by habitat loss caused agricultural expansion. It occurs in some protected areas, including the Gaoligongshan National Nature Reserve in Yunnan.

References

pageoti
Frogs of China
Amphibians of Myanmar
Amphibians of Vietnam
Near threatened animals
Amphibians described in 1937
Taxa named by René Léon Bourret
Taxonomy articles created by Polbot